Turaclı is a village and municipality in the Qakh Rayon of Azerbaijan.  It has a population of 992.

References 

Populated places in Qakh District